Hardistiella montanensis is a fossil fish and extinct species of lamprey found, dating from the Carboniferous period, at the Bear Gulch Limestone site in the U.S. state of Montana.

References

Lampreys